Sixteen different ships of the British Royal Navy have been named HMS Greyhound, after the greyhound, a breed of dog notable for its speed.

  was a 45-gun ship built in 1545, rebuilt 1558, and wrecked 1563
 Greyhound was a ship in service in 1585
  was a 12-gun ship launched in 1636 and blown up 1656 in action with the Spanish
  was a 20-gun ship captured from the Royalists in 1657 and used as a fire ship in 1666
  was a 16-gun sixth rate in service from 1672 to 1698
  was a 6-gun bomb vessel purchased in 1694 and sold 1698
  was a 42-gun fifth rate launched at Ipswich in 1702 and wrecked off Teignmouth (or Tynemouth?) August 1711
  was a 20-gun sixth rate launched in 1712 and captured by the Spanish in 1718
  was a 20-gun sixth rate launched in 1719, in Spanish hands in April 1722, and broken up 1741
  was a 20-gun sixth rate in service from 1741 to 1768
  was a 15-gun cutter purchased in 1763, hulked in 1776, and sold 1780
  was a 28-gun sixth rate launched in 1773 and wrecked 1780
  was a 14-gun cutter purchased in 1780, renamed Viper in 1781, and sold in October 1809
  was a 32-gun fifth rate launched 1783 and wrecked 1808.  Because Greyhound served in the navy's Egyptian campaign between 8 March 1801 and 2 September, her officers and crew qualified for the clasp "Egypt" to the Naval General Service Medal, which the Admiralty authorised in 1850 for all surviving claimants. 
  was laid down as Greyhound, but renamed before launching
  was a  sloop launched in 1859, reduced to harbour service in 1869, and sold 1906
  was a G-class destroyer launched in 1935 and sunk by German dive bombers in 1941
 HMS Greyhound was to be a G-class destroyer, ordered in 1944 but cancelled in December 1945

See also
 At least one revenue cutter Greyhound
 The armed cutter Greyhound of 12 guns, hired from 10 August 1798 to 13 February 1799
 , a 24-gun ship captured in 1665 and sold in 1667.

Notes and citations

Notes

Citations

References
 
 

Royal Navy ship names